In geometry, a 7-orthoplex, or 7-cross polytope, is a regular 7-polytope with 14 vertices, 84 edges,  280 triangle faces, 560 tetrahedron cells, 672 5-cells 4-faces, 448  5-faces, and 128 6-faces.

It has two constructed forms, the first being regular with Schläfli symbol {35,4}, and the second with alternately labeled (checkerboarded) facets, with Schläfli symbol {3,3,3,3,31,1} or Coxeter symbol 411.

It is a part of an infinite family of polytopes, called cross-polytopes or orthoplexes. The dual polytope is the 7-hypercube, or hepteract.

Alternate names
 Heptacross, derived from combining the family name cross polytope with hept for seven (dimensions) in Greek. 
 Hecatonicosoctaexon as a 128-facetted 7-polytope (polyexon).

As a configuration
This configuration matrix represents the 7-orthoplex. The rows and columns correspond to vertices, edges, faces, cells, 4-faces, 5-faces and 6-faces. The diagonal numbers say how many of each element occur in the whole 7-orthoplex. The nondiagonal numbers say how many of the column's element occur in or at the row's element.

Images

Construction 

There are two Coxeter groups associated with the 7-orthoplex, one regular, dual of the hepteract with the C7 or [4,3,3,3,3,3] symmetry group, and a half symmetry with two copies of 6-simplex facets, alternating, with the D7 or [34,1,1] symmetry group. A lowest symmetry construction is based on a dual of a 7-orthotope, called a 7-fusil.

Cartesian coordinates 
Cartesian coordinates for the vertices of a 7-orthoplex, centered at the origin are
 (±1,0,0,0,0,0,0), (0,±1,0,0,0,0,0), (0,0,±1,0,0,0,0), (0,0,0,±1,0,0,0), (0,0,0,0,±1,0,0), (0,0,0,0,0,±1,0), (0,0,0,0,0,0,±1)

Every vertex pair is connected by an edge, except opposites.

See also 
 Rectified 7-orthoplex
 Truncated 7-orthoplex

References 

 H.S.M. Coxeter: 
 H.S.M. Coxeter, Regular Polytopes, 3rd Edition, Dover New York, 1973 
 Kaleidoscopes: Selected Writings of H.S.M. Coxeter, edited by F. Arthur Sherk, Peter McMullen, Anthony C. Thompson, Asia Ivic Weiss, Wiley-Interscience Publication, 1995,  
 (Paper 22) H.S.M. Coxeter, Regular and Semi Regular Polytopes I, [Math. Zeit. 46 (1940) 380-407, MR 2,10]
 (Paper 23) H.S.M. Coxeter, Regular and Semi-Regular Polytopes II, [Math. Zeit. 188 (1985) 559-591]
 (Paper 24) H.S.M. Coxeter, Regular and Semi-Regular Polytopes III, [Math. Zeit. 200 (1988) 3-45]
 Norman Johnson Uniform Polytopes, Manuscript (1991)
 N.W. Johnson: The Theory of Uniform Polytopes and Honeycombs, Ph.D. (1966)

External links 

 Polytopes of Various Dimensions
 Multi-dimensional Glossary

7-polytopes